Lost Highway is a compilation album by country artist Willie Nelson. It was released on August 11, 2009.

Track listing 
"Maria (Shut Up and Kiss Me)" (Rob Thomas) – 4:20
with Rob Thomas
"Mendocino Country Line" (Matt Serletic, Bernie Taupin) – 4:32
with Lee Ann Womack
"Back to Earth" (Willie Nelson) – 2:58
"The Harder They Come" (Jimmy Cliff) – 3:38
"Over You Again" (Willie Nelson, Micah Nelson, Lukas Nelson) – 5:35
"You Don't Know Me" (Eddy Arnold, Cindy Walker) – 3:40
"Lost Highway" (Leon Payne) – 2:52
with Ray Price
"Beer for My Horses" (Scotty Emerick, Toby Keith) – 3:30
with Toby Keith
"Blue Eyes Crying in the Rain" (Fred Rose) – 2:58
with Shania Twain
"Overtime" (Lucinda Williams) – 3:44
with Lucinda Williams
"I'm Still Not Over You" (Willie Nelson) – 3:59
with Ray Price
"Superman" (Willie Nelson) – 2:12
"Bubbles in My Beer" (Tommy Duncan, Cindy Walker, Bob Wills) – 2:48
"Crazy" (Willie Nelson) – 4:37
with Diana Krall and Elvis Costello
"Both Sides of Goodbye" (Jackson Leap, Kim Williams) – 4:18
"Cowboys Are Frequently, Secretly Fond of Each Other" (Ned Sublette) – 3:33
"Ain't Goin' Down on Brokeback Mountain" (Ben Hayslip, Brandon Kinney, Wynn Varble) – 2:53

Chart performance

Personnel 
Willie Nelson - Guitar, vocals

References

2009 compilation albums
Willie Nelson compilation albums
Lost Highway Records compilation albums